The 2010 Madeira floods and mudslides were the result of an extreme weather event that affected Madeira Island in Portugal's autonomous Madeira archipelago on 20 February 2010. The flash flood killed 51 people, of whom 6 are still to be found, and injured 250. Around 600 people were left homeless.

Causes 
The rainfall was associated with an active cold front and an Atlantic low-pressure area that was over the Azores and moved northeastwards on 19 February 2010.

This storm was one in a series of such storms that affected Spain, Portugal, Morocco and the Canary Islands with flooding, rain and high winds. These storms were bolstered by an unusually strong temperature contrast of the sea surface across the Atlantic Ocean. Abnormally warm waters had been widespread off West Africa whereas relatively cold surface waters had stretched between western Europe and the southeastern United States.

The storm was exacerbated by the eruption cloud of the Soufrière Hills volcano.

The floods and mudslides were the result of an extreme weather event that, in some places, dropped more than double the monthly average of rainfall in a very short period. Between 6 a.m. and 11 a.m. local time (and UTC), 108 mm (4¼ inches) of rain was recorded at Funchal weather station and 165 mm (6½ inches) of rain at the weather station on Pico do Arieiro. The average rainfall in Funchal for the whole of February is 88.0 mm (3½ inches).

Effects 

Damage was confined to the south of the island.

The city of Funchal was heavily damaged by landslides. In one instance, mud and water gushed down a city street over cars and buildings. Communications were seriously disrupted across the island.

Amid the destruction, the airport was closed, bridges were washed away, and one man saw his family swept off by the waters. One hotel manager commented, "This was worse than the last really big storm in 1993. We have been told that three inches of rain fell in an hour. I saw a new BMW floating past the end of my street today."

As of 2020, five families still do not have a permanent home.

Emergency response 
Portuguese Prime Minister José Sócrates said he was "absolutely saddened and shocked with the images, with the consequences of this calamity." He promised the government would provide help to ensure Madeira could begin recovery work as quickly as possible. Sócrates and Interior Minister Rui Pereira planned a flight to the island to examine and evaluate the damages and to coordinate aid efforts with the local autonomous government of Alberto João Jardim. Local government authorities made temporary shelters available for the homeless, estimated in the hundreds. The Portuguese military sent a naval frigate, containing medical equipment and a helicopter, to Madeira. However, the Portuguese government declined to declare a state of emergency in the region, which would have made them eligible to obtain funds from the European Union, saying, “We don’t need anything from Brussels. We know exactly what we will do. We don’t need any help; we will solve our problems.”

The UK Foreign and Commonwealth Office reported that five Britons sustained injuries, and one is missing. As of 26 February, Portuguese official sources reported 42 dead and 8 missing, of whom only one was a tourist.

Reconstruction and cleaning work started a few hours after the rainfall. On the same day, several dozen units of heavy machinery and trucks were seen in the streets of Funchal and other major affected sites, cleaning streets as well as rocks and mud accumulated in the "ribeiras". In the next few days this number peaked to several hundred heavy units and trucks operating in all affected sites. In spite of some access restrictions in the centre of Funchal and some other parts of the island, all services were soon fully functional and normal life was restored. No tourist resorts were affected by the event, except for a few small hotels inland where some blocked roads caused access restrictions.

Humanitarian response 
In support of the flood victims, Real Madrid footballer and noted Madeiran Cristiano Ronaldo pledged to play in a charity match in Madeira, between the Portuguese Liga club Porto and players from Madeiran-based Portuguese Liga clubs C.S. Marítimo and Nacional.

References

External links

Map with interactive and updated information on the events in Madeira
YouTube short movie with mudslide and flooding images
Image from the Toronto Sun
Floods and mudslides pictures by locals''

2010 in Portugal
Landslides in Portugal
Floods in Portugal
2010 floods in Europe
History of Madeira
Landslides in 2010
February 2010 events in Europe
2010 disasters in Portugal